Fifth Five-Year Plan may refer to:

Fifth Five-Year Plan (People's Republic of China)
Five-Year Plans of India#Fifth Plan (1974–1978)
Fifth Five-Year Plan (Soviet Union)
Fifth Five-Year Plans (Pakistan)

See also
Five-year plan (disambiguation)
Fourth Five-Year Plan (disambiguation)
Sixth Five-Year Plan (disambiguation)